Carry On Again Doctor is a 1969 British comedy film, the 18th release in the series of 31 Carry On films (1958–1992). It was released in December 1969 and was the third to feature a medical theme. The film features series regulars Sid James, Kenneth Williams, Charles Hawtrey, Joan Sims, Barbara Windsor and Hattie Jacques. This was Jim Dale's last Carry On appearance for 23 years until his return in Carry On Columbus. It also marks the debut of Patsy Rowlands to the series in her first of 9 appearances.

Plot
At the Long Hampton Hospital, Dr Jimmy Nookey (Jim Dale) seems to attract trouble, beginning with an incident in the women's washroom, which he'd mistakenly entered, frightening the highly-strung Miss Armitage out of her senses. Nookey's carefree manner isn't to everyone's liking at the hospital, with Dr. Stoppidge (Charles Hawtrey) wanting Nookey sacked for the washroom incident. Accident-prone Nookey then quickly falls in love with a film star patient named Goldie Locks (Barbara Windsor). During some misadventures with the hospital's X-ray machine Nookey triggers a massive short circuit in the hospital's electrical system resulting in more mayhem.  With the hospital Matron (Hattie Jacques) and his moody boss Dr. Frederick Carver (Kenneth Williams) now watching his every move, Dr. Nookey drinks a fruit punch spiked by jealous Dr. Stoppidge at the staff party. The drunk Nookey ends up crashing through a window on a hospital trolley, after he had almost got into bed with a patient. Goldie leaves Nookey, as the latter is not interested in marriage.  Meanwhile, Carver and his rich patient Ellen Moore (Joan Sims) dispatch the disgraced Nookey to Moore's medical mission in the Beatific Islands, where it rains for nine months of the year. Nookey discovers Gladstone Screwer (Sid James), the local medicine man, who has a weight-loss serum.  Nookey soon returns to England and opens a new surgery with Mrs. Moore, much to the anger of Carver. While Matron joins Dr. Nookey's clinic, Carver and Stoppidge plot to try to steal the serum.  Stoppidge dresses as a female patient to effect the theft, but his luck runs out when Nookey catches him in the act. Goldie returns to have the serum as well, much to Nookey's chagrin. Gladstone quickly discovers that Nookey is making a fortune from his serum, and cuts off his supply to deliver the serum in person and get in on the action. Nookey prevaricates, so Gladstone gives him a serum, which in fact seems to cause sex changes! The movie ends with Nookey and Goldie getting married at the Moore-Nookey-Gladstone-Carver facility, and the rest of the staff of the Long Hampton Hospital becoming friends again.

Production notes
The original script for Carry On Again Doctor raised problems with Rank's legal adviser, who felt it was too similar to an unfilmed 'Doctor' script that Talbot Rothwell, writer of Carry On Again Doctor, had previously submitted to producer Betty Box. Most notably, both scenarios featured the medical mission/slimming potion idea. As Box had not taken up the option on Rothwell's 'Doctor' script, however, it was felt there were no legal problems with the use of those ideas in this film.

Cast

Sid James as Gladstone Screwer
Jim Dale as Doctor Jimmy Nookey
Kenneth Williams as Doctor Frederick Carver
Charles Hawtrey as Doctor Ernest Stoppidge/Lady Puddleton
Joan Sims as Ellen Moore
Barbara Windsor as Goldie Locks (real name Maud Boggins)
Hattie Jacques as Miss Soaper, the Matron
Patsy Rowlands as Miss Fosdick
Peter Butterworth as Shuffling patient
Wilfrid Brambell as Mr Pullen
Elizabeth Knight as Nurse Willing
Peter Gilmore as Henry
Alexandra Dane as Stout woman
Pat Coombs as New Matron
William Mervyn as Lord Paragon
Patricia Hayes as Mrs Beasley
Lucy Griffiths as Old lady in headphones
Harry Locke as Porter
Gwendolyn Watts as Night sister
Valerie Leon as Deirdre Filkington-Battermore
Frank Singuineau as Porter
Valerie Van Ost as Out-Patients Sister
Simon Cain as X-ray man
Elspeth March as Hospital board member
Valerie Shute as Nurse
Shakira Baksh as Scrubba
Ann Lancaster as Miss Armitage
Frank Forsyth as Mr Bean (uncredited)
Georgina Simpson as Men's ward nurse (uncredited)
Eric Rogers as Bandleader (uncredited)
Donald Bisset as Patient (uncredited)
Bob Todd as Pump patient (uncredited)
Heather Emmanuel as Plump native girl (uncredited)
Yutte Stensgaard as Trolley Nurse (uncredited)
George Roderick as Waiter (uncredited)
Jenny Counsell as Night nurse (uncredited)
Rupert Evans as Stunt orderly (uncredited)
Billy Cornelius as Patient in plaster (uncredited)
Hugh Futcher as Cab driver (uncredited)
Faith Kent as Nursing home Matron (uncredited)

Wilfred Brambell's character was a non-speaking cameo in an early scene. When he appeared, the theme from Steptoe and Son was played over his scene.

Crew
Screenplay – Talbot Rothwell
Music – Eric Rogers
Production Manager – Jack Swinburne
Art Director – John Blezard
Editor – Alfred Roome
Director of Photography – Ernest Steward
Camera Operator – James Bawden
Assistant Editor – Jack Gardner
Continuity – Susanna Merry
Make-up – Geoffrey Rodway
Assistant Director – Ivor Powell
Sound Recordists – Bill Daniels & Ken Barker
Hairdresser – Stella Rivers
Costume Designer – Anna Duse
Dubbing Editor – Colin Miller
Producer – Peter Rogers
Director – Gerald Thomas

Filming and locations

Filming dates – 17 March – 2 May 1969

Interiors:
 Pinewood Studios, Buckinghamshire

Exteriors:
 Maidenhead, where the town hall doubled for the hospital as it previously did in Carry On Doctor.
 Pinewood Studios. Heatherden Hall, the studio management block was used as the exterior for the Moore-Nookey Clinic
 Windsor, Berkshire. Location of Dr Nookey's consulting rooms (the same location featured in Carry On Regardless as the Helping Hands Agency and in Carry On Loving as the Wedded Bliss agency).

Release
When the film was released by American International Pictures in New York in February 1973, they released it under the title Carry on Doctor.

The sequence where Dr Nookie short circuits the hospital's electrical system and the ensuing mayhem formed introduction to the 1980s compilation show Carry On Laughing.

Critical reception
Empire wrote "The fast moving plot and changing locations keep the show moving, and makes this one of the more successful entries in the series."

Bibliography

Keeping the British End Up: Four Decades of Saucy Cinema by Simon Sheridan (third edition) (2007) (Reynolds & Hearn Books)

References

External links 
 
Carry On Again Doctor Location Guide at The Whippit Inn

1969 films
Again Doctor
1960s English-language films
Films directed by Gerald Thomas
Films set in hospitals
1969 comedy films
Films shot at Pinewood Studios
Films produced by Peter Rogers
Films with screenplays by Talbot Rothwell
1960s British films